São Paulo FC is the basketball section of the São Paulo FC club, based in São Paulo, Brazil. The men's first team plays professionally in the Novo Basquete Brasil (NBB).

Home games are played at the Multisport Gym Doctor Antônio Leme Nunes Galvão, which has a capacity for 1,900 people. The club was inactive for a long time but it resumed operations in November 2018, starting competing in the second-tier LOB for the 2018–19 season. After a second-place finish promotion to the top-level NBB was secured.

In 2022, São Paulo made its debut in the BCL Americas, the top tier panamerican competition and won its first-ever continental title after defeating Club Biguá in the Final.

Honours

Domestic competitions
Brazilian Championship (NBB):
Runners-up (1): 2020–21
Super 8:
Runners-up (2): 2020–21, 2021–22
Campeonato Paulista:
Winners (1): 2021
Runners-up (1): 2022
Campeonato Paulistano:
Winners (1): 1943

International competitions
BCL Americas:
Winners (1): 2021–22
Fourth place (1): 2020–21
FIBA Intercontinental Cup:
Runners-up (1): 2023

Players

Current roster

Notable players
- Set a club record or won an individual award as a professional player.
- Played at least one official international match for his senior national team at any time.
  Henrique Coelho 
  Isaac Gonçalves
  Lucas Mariano 
  Marquinhos

Performance in international competitions 
Since their return to professional basketball in 2018, São Paulo has played in FIBA Americas administered competitions three times. The club's best performance was in the 2021-22 season, when they won the BCL Americas after going unbeaten in the competition with 9 wins and no losses.

Key:

 GP: Games played
 W: Wins
 L: Losses

References

External links
Champions League profile
Latinbasket.com profile

Basketball teams in Brazil
Basketball teams established in 1930
São Paulo FC